Annick Lipman (born 13 March 1989) is a Dutch handball goalkeeper who plays for Byåsen HE and the Dutch national team.

Previously, she played for SV Dalfsen, Vipers Kristiansand and Gjerpen IF. She was selected to represent the Netherlands at the 2019 World Women's Handball Championship and 2020 European Women's Handball Championship.

Achievements
Norwegian League
Bronze Medalist: 2019/2020

Individual awards
 All-Star Goalkeeper of Eliteserien: 2019/2020

References

External links

1989 births
Living people
Sportspeople from Zwolle
Dutch female handball players
Expatriate handball players
Dutch expatriate sportspeople in Norway
21st-century Dutch women